Billy Wayne Montgomery, also known as Coach Montgomery (born July 7, 1937), is a former educator who represented the Bossier City-based District 9 in the Louisiana House of Representatives from 1988-2008. He was elected as a Democrat, but he switched affiliation to the Republican Party on October 3, 2006.

On August 6, 2016, Montgomery and four others were inducted into the Ark-La-Tex Sports Museum of Champions at the Shreveport Convention Center. Since its opening in 2007 through 2015, 132 persons had already been selected for this honor. Inducted with Montgomery are Ray Germany, a Louisiana Tech Bulldogs basketball All-American in 1959 and 1960 who resides in Haughton; Mickey Slaughter, a former Denver Broncos quarterback and Louisiana Tech football coach; hot air balloonist Bill Bussey, a dentist from Longview, Texas, and the professional golf caddie Freddie C. Burns Sr., an African-American from Shreveport, who for thirty-eight years was associated with Hal Sutton.

Early life and education
Montgomery graduated from Provencal High School in Natchitoches Parish, Louisiana. He received a bachelors in 1959 and masters degree from Northwestern State College. He also studied at Louisiana Tech University, Louisiana State University in Baton Rouge and the Northeast Louisiana University. he served in the United States Army from 1959 to 1964.

References

https://web.archive.org/web/20060924031658/http://house.legis.state.la.us/H-Reps/members.asp?ID=9
"TenLeastWanted.com, Louisiana Pro-Life Alliance, 721 Government Street, Suite 103-120, Baton Rouge, LA 70802.

1937 births
Living people
Educators from Louisiana
High school basketball coaches in the United States
Politicians from Bossier City, Louisiana
Politicians from Natchitoches, Louisiana
Northwestern State University alumni
Louisiana Tech University alumni
Republican Party members of the Louisiana House of Representatives
United States Army personnel
People from Haughton, Louisiana
Assemblies of God people
Louisiana State University alumni